30 Years Sodomized: 1982–2012 is a three-disc, two-LP box set by German thrash metal band Sodom, released on 25 June 2012.  The set includes the albums Official Bootleg: The Witchhunter Decade, a collection of live recordings and unreleased demos, and 30 Years' War, a retrospective selection of studio tracks personally compiled by Tom Angelripper.

Track listing

Disc one: The Witchhunter Decade

Disc two: 30 Years' War

Disc three: 30 Years' War

LP one: The Witchhunter Decade

Side one

Side two

LP two: The Witchhunter Decade

Side one

Side two

Personnel

The Witchhunter Decade
 Tom Angelripper: vocals, bass
 Chris Witchhunter: drums
 Josef "Grave Violator" Dominik, guitar
 Uwe Christophers, guitar
 Frank Blackfire, guitar
 Michael Hoffman, guitar
 Andy Brings, guitar

30 Years' War
 Tom Angelripper: vocals, bass (all tracks)
 Chris Witchhunter: drums, tracks 1-12 (disc one)
 Guido "Atomic Steif" Richter: drums, tracks 13-15 (disc one) and tracks 1-3 (disc two)
 Bobby Schottkowski: drums, tracks 4-15 (disc two)
 Josef "Grave Violator" Dominik: guitar, track 1 (disc one)
 Michael Wulf: guitar, track 2 (disc one)
 Frank Blackfire: guitar, tracks 3-7 (disc one)
 Michael Hoffman: guitar, tracks 8-10 (disc one)
 Andy Brings: guitar, tracks 11-15 (disc one)
 Dirk "Strahli" Strahlmeier: guitar, tracks 1-3 (disc two)
 Bernd "Bernemann" Kost: guitar, tracks 4-15 (disc two)

Charts

References

External links

 
 

2012 compilation albums
Sodom (band) compilation albums
SPV/Steamhammer compilation albums